The  is an electric multiple unit (EMU) train type operated on the Tōyō Rapid Railway, an extension of Tokyo Metro Tōzai Line. It replaces the Tōyō Rapid 1000 series.

A total of 11 10-car sets were built between 2004 and 2006 by Hitachi, based on the Tokyo Metro 05 series 13th-batch (sets 05-140 to 05-143) (05N series) design.

The driver's handle is a single handle controlled by the left hand and it has a dead man system. The partition between the driver's cab and passenger saloon has three windows. Two of the windows are usually screened by curtains on the Tōzai Line, but one window is left unobstructed so passengers can look the view ahead, even on subway tracks.

Other technical details
 Front end style: Round lights, Have a front skirt
 Headlights: HID
 Destination indication: 3-color LED
 LED displays inside car: 4 per car
 Control system: IGBT-VVVF
 Motor/trailer: 5M5T
 Motor output (per motor): 165 kW
 Train power output: 3,300 kW
 Gear ratio: 6.21 (87:14)
 Pantograph: single-arm x3
 Door width: 
 Seat configuration (intermediate cars): 3-7-7-7-3

References

Electric multiple units of Japan
Train-related introductions in 2004
1500 V DC multiple units of Japan
Hitachi multiple units